The Electoral district of Maryborough was an electorate of the Victorian Legislative Assembly based on an area around Maryborough, Victoria.
It was created in the expansion of the Assembly by the Victorian Electoral Act, 1858, which took effect at the election in 1859.

The district was defined as: 
 also known as Tullaroop Creek.          also known as Bet Bet Creek.

Maryborough was abolished by the Electoral Act Amendment Act 1876 (taking effect in 1877) and replaced by Electoral district of Maryborough and Talbot.

Maryborough was recreated in 1889 after 'Maryborough and Talbot' was split by the Seat Distribution Bill of 1888. 
In 1927 the district of Maryborough was again abolished, replaced by the Electoral district of Maryborough and Daylesford.

Members

 Davies won both Maryborough and Villiers and Heytesbury at the August 1861 general elections, he resigned from Maryborough.

Election results

See also
 Parliaments of the Australian states and territories
 List of members of the Victorian Legislative Assembly

References

Former members Parliament of Victoria

Former electoral districts of Victoria (Australia)
1859 establishments in Australia
1889 establishments in Australia
1877 disestablishments in Australia
1927 disestablishments in Australia